Haumont-près-Samogneux (literally Haumont near Samogneux) is a commune in the Meuse department in Grand Est in north-eastern France.

The capture of the town by the German Fifth Army began the Battle of Verdun during World War I in 1916. Since then, it has been unoccupied (official population: 0) along with Bezonvaux, Beaumont-en-Verdunois, Louvemont-Côte-du-Poivre, Cumières-le-Mort-Homme and Fleury-devant-Douaumont.

During the war, the town was completely destroyed and the land was made uninhabitable to such an extent that a decision was made not to rebuild it. The site of the commune is maintained as a testimony to war and is officially designated as a "village that died for France." It is managed by a municipal council of three members appointed by the prefect of the Meuse department.

See also
 Zone rouge (First World War)
 List of French villages destroyed in World War I
 Communes of the Meuse department

References

Haumontpressamogneux
Destroyed towns
Former populated places in France